The 2018 Federation Tournament of Champions took place at the Cool Insuring Arena in Glens Falls on March 23, 24 and 25. Federation championships were awarded in the AA, A and B classifications. Archbishop Stepinac in White Plains won the Class AA championship. Alan Griffin of Archbishop Stepinac was named the Class AA tournament's most valuable player.

Class AA 

Participating teams, results and individual honors in Class AA were as follows:

Participating teams

Results 

Archbishop Stepinac finished the season with a 27-5 record.

There was controversy in the Archbishop Stepinac-Long Island Lutheran semifinal game. With the score tied at 8.3 seconds remaining in the game, Long Island Lutheran called a timeout, but officials determined that the team had no timeouts remaining. Long Island Lutheran was assessed a technical foul. Archbishop Stepinac made two technical free throws to take the lead and was awarded possession of the ball. Archbishop Stepinac made two more free throws after play resumed, to win by four points. Long Island Lutheran claimed it did have one timeout remaining and protested the game, arguing that the final 8.3 seconds should be replayed. Officials acknowledged the next day that the official scorekeeper had made an error, but denied the protest.

Individual honors 

The following players were awarded individual honors for their performances at the Federation Tournament:

Most Valuable Player 

 Alan Griffin, Archbishop Stepinac

All-Tournament Team 

 R.J. Davis, Archbishop Stepinac
 Adrian Griffin, Jr., Archbishop Stepinac
 Naz Johnson, Liverpool
 Donatas Kupšas, Long Island Lutheran
 Femi Odukale, South Shore Campus

Sportsmanship Award 

 Sekou Sylla, South Shore Campus

Class A 

Participating teams, results and individual honors in Class A were as follows:

Participating teams

Results 

The Park School of Buffalo finished the season with a 25-5 record.

Individual honors 

The following players were awarded individual honors for their performances at the Federation Tournament:

Most Valuable Player 

 Noah Hutchins, Park

All-Tournament Team 

 Marcus Filen, Albany Academy
 August Mahoney, Albany Academy
 Victor Ogbo, Brooklyn Law and Technology
 Daniel Scott, Park
 Joshua Serrano, Amityville Memorial

Sportsmanship Award 

 Julian Eziukwu, Park

Class B 

Participating teams, results and individual honors in Class B were as follows:

Participating teams

Results 

Fannie Lou Hamer Freedom finished the season with a 29-4 record.

Individual honors 

The following players were awarded individual honors for their performances at the Federation Tournament:

Most Valuable Player 

 Charles Davis, Fannie Lou Hamer Freedom

All-Tournament Team 

 Liam Gallagher, Regis
 Aidan Igiehon, Lawrence Woodmere Academy
 Jordan Jackson, Mekeel Christian Academy
 Tyree Morris, Fannie Lou Hamer Freedom
 Frankie Williams, Fannie Lou Hamer Freedom

Sportsmanship Award 

 Gideon Agbo, Mekeel Christian Academy

External links 

 http://www.nysbasketballbrackets.com/

References

High school basketball competitions in the United States
High school sports in New York (state)
Sports in Glens Falls, New York
Basketball competitions in New York (state)
High
New York